Strategos, plural strategoi, Latinized strategus, (Doric Greek: στραταγός, stratagos; meaning "army leader") is used in Greek to mean military general. In the Hellenistic world and the Eastern Roman Empire the term was also used to describe a military governor. In the modern Hellenic Army, it is the highest officer rank.

Etymology 

Strategos is a compound of two Greek words: stratos and agos. Stratos (στρατός)  means "army", literally "that which is spread out", coming from the proto-Indo-European root *stere- "to spread". Agos (ἀγός) means "leader", from agein (ἄγειν) "to lead", from the proto-Ιndo-Εuropean root *ag- "to drive, draw out or forth, move”.

Classical Greece

Athens 
In its most famous attestation, in Classical Athens, the office of strategos existed already in the 6th century BC, but it was only with the reforms of Cleisthenes in 501 BC that it assumed its most recognizable form: Cleisthenes instituted a board of ten strategoi who were elected annually, one from each tribe (phyle). The ten were of equal status, and replaced the polemarchos, who had hitherto been the senior military commander. At the Battle of Marathon in 490 BC (according to Herodotus) they decided strategy by majority vote, and each held the presidency in daily rotation. At this date the polemarchos had a casting vote, and one view among modern scholars is that he was the commander-in-chief; but from 486 onwards the polemarchos, like the other archontes, was appointed by lot. The annual election of the strategoi was held in the spring, and their term of office coincided with the ordinary Athenian year, from midsummer to midsummer. If a strategos died or was dismissed from office, a by-election might be held to replace him.

The strict adherence to the principle of a strategos from each tribe lasted until , after which two strategoi could be selected from the same tribe and another tribe be left without its own strategos, perhaps because no suitable candidate might be available. Hence, during the Hellenistic period, although the number of the tribes was increased, the number of strategoi remained constant at ten.

In the early part of the 5th century, several strategoi combined their military office with a political role, with Themistocles, Aristides, Cimon, or Pericles among the most notable; nevertheless their power derived not from their office, but from their own personal political charisma. As political power passed to the civilian rhetores in the later 5th century, the strategoi were limited to their military duties. Originally, the strategoi were appointed ad hoc to various assignments. On campaign, several—usually up to three—strategoi might be placed jointly in command. Unlike other Greek states, where the nauarchos commanded the navy, the Athenian strategoi held command both at sea and on land. From the middle of the 4th century, the strategoi increasingly were given specific assignments, such as the strategos epi ten choran for the defence of Attica; the strategos epi tous hoplitas, in charge of expeditions abroad; the two strategoi epi ton Peiraia, responsible for the war harbour of Piraeus; and the strategos epi tas symmorias, responsible for the equipment of the warships.  This was generalized in Hellenistic times, when each strategos was given specific duties. In the Roman Imperial period, the strategos epi ta hopla became the most prominent magistrate in Athens. The other generals had disappeared by the end of the first century BC.

The Athenian people kept a close eye on their strategoi. Like other magistrates, at the end of their term of office they were subject to euthyna and in addition there was a vote in the ekklesia during every prytany on the question whether they were performing their duties well. If the vote went against anyone, he was deposed and as a rule tried by jury. Pericles himself in 430 was removed from office as strategos and fined, and in 406 six of the eight strategoi who commanded the fleet at the Battle of Arginusae were all removed from office and condemned to death.

Other Greek states
The title of strategos appears for a number of other Greek states in the Classical period, but it is often unclear whether this refers to an actual office, or is used as a generic term for military commander. The strategos as an office is attested at least for Syracuse from the late 5th century BC, Erythrae, and in the koinon of the Arcadians in the 360s BC.

The title of strategos autokrator was also used for generals with broad powers, but the extent and nature of these powers was granted on an ad hoc basis. Thus Philip II of Macedon was elected as strategos autokrator (commander-in-chief with full powers) of the League of Corinth.

Hellenistic and Roman use 
Under Philip II of Macedon, the title of strategos was used for commanders on detached assignments as the quasi-representatives of the king, often with a title indicating their area of responsibility, e.g. strategos tes Europes ("strategos of Europe").

In several Greek city leagues the title strategos was reserved for the head of state. In the Aetolian League and the Achaean League, where the strategos was annually elected, he was the eponymous chief of civil government and the supreme military commander at the same time. Two of the most prominent leaders re-elected many times to the office in the Achaean League, were Aratus of Sicyon and Philopoemen of Megalopolis. Strategoi are also reported in the Arcadian League, in the Epirote League  and in the Acarnanian League, whereas the leaders of the Boeotian League and the Thessalian League had different titles, Boeotarch and Tagus respectively.

In the Hellenistic empires of the Diadochi, notably Lagid Egypt, for which most details are known, strategos became a gubernatorial office combining civil with military duties. In Egypt, the strategoi were originally responsible for the Greek military colonists (klerouchoi) established in the country. Quickly, they assumed a role in the administration alongside the nomarches, the governor of each of the country's nomes, and the oikonomos, in charge of fiscal affairs. Already by the time of Ptolemy II Philadelphus (r. 283–246 BC), the strategos was the head of the provincial administration, while conversely his military role declined, as the klerouchoi were progressively demilitarized. Ptolemy V Epiphanes (r. 204–181 BC) established the office of epistrategos ("over-general") to oversee the individual strategoi. The latter had become solely civilian officials, combining the role of the nomarches and the oikonomos, while the epistrategos retained powers of military command. In addition, hypostrategoi (sing. hypostrategos) could be appointed as subordinates. The Ptolemaic administrative system survived into the Roman period, where the epistrategos was subdivided in three to four smaller offices, and the procurator ad epistrategiam was placed in charge of the strategoi. The office largely retained its Ptolemaic functions and continued to be staffed by the Greek population of the country.

The Odrysian kingdom of Thrace was also divided into strategiai ("generalships"), each headed by a strategos, based on the various Thracian tribes and subtribes. At the time of the kingdom's annexation into the Roman Empire in 46 AD, there were 50 such districts, which were initially retained in the new Roman province, and only gradually fell out of use. It was not until c. 136 that the last of them were abolished.

Under the Roman Republic and later through the Principate, Greek historians often used the term strategos when referring to the Roman political/military office of praetor. Such a use can be found in the New Testament: Acts of the Apostles 16:20 refers to the magistrates of Philippi as strategoi (στρατηγοί). Correspondingly, antistrategos ("vice-general") was used to refer to the office of propraetor.

Byzantine use 

The term continued in use in the Greek-speaking Byzantine Empire. Initially, the term was used along with stratelates and, less often, stratopedarches, to render the supreme military office of magister militum (the general in command of a field army), but could also be employed for the regional duces. In the 7th century, with the creation of the Theme system, their role changed: as the field armies were resettled and became the basis for the territorial themes, their generals too assumed new responsibilities, combining their military duties with the civil governance of the theme. The first themes were few and very large, and in the 8th century, the provincial strategoi were in constant antagonism with the emperor at Constantinople, rising often in rebellion against him. In response, the themes were progressively split up and the number of strategoi increased, diluting their power. This process was furthered by the conquests of the 10th century, which saw the establishment of several new and smaller frontier themes: while in c. 842 the Taktikon Uspensky lists 18 strategoi, the Escorial Taktikon, written c. 971–975, lists almost 90.

Throughout the middle Byzantine period (7th–12th centuries), the strategos of the Anatolic theme enjoyed precedence over the others and constituted one of the highest offices of the state, and one of the few from which eunuchs were specifically barred. At the same time, the Eastern (Anatolian) themes were senior to the Western (European) ones. This distinction was especially marked in the pay of their presiding strategoi: while those of the Eastern themes received their salary directly from the state treasury, their counterparts in the West had to raise their—markedly lower—pay from the proceeds of their provinces. During the 11th century, the strategoi were gradually confined to their military duties, their fiscal and administrative responsibilities being taken over by the civil kritai ("judges"). Senior military leadership also devolved on the hands of a new class of officers titled doukes or katepano, who were placed in control of regional commands combining several themes. By the 13th century, the term strategos had reverted to the generic sense of "general", devoid of any specific technical meaning.

The Byzantines also used a number of variations of the title strategos: strategetes (στρατηγέτης, "army leader") was an infrequently used alternative term; the term monostrategos (μονοστράτηγος, "single-general") designated a general placed in command over other strategoi or over the forces of more than one theme; the terms strategos autokrator, archistrategos ("chief-general") and protostrategos (πρωτοστράτηγος, "first-general") designated commanders vested with supreme authority; and the term hypostrategos ("under-general") denoted a second-in-command, effectively a lieutenant general.

In Messina 

The city of Messina in Sicily also had a Strategos. In 1345 Orlando d'Aragona, illegitimate son of Frederick II of Sicily, held that position.

Modern use 

In the modern Hellenic Army, a stratigós (the spelling remains στρατηγός) is the highest officer rank. The superior rank of stratárchis (Field Marshal) existed under the monarchy, but has not been retained by the current Third Hellenic Republic. Under the monarchy, the rank of full stratigós in active service was reserved for the King and a few other members of the royal family, with very few retired career officers promoted to the rank as an honorary rank. Since , in accordance with NATO practice for the member nations' chiefs of defence, the rank is held in active service by the Chief of the General Staff of National Defence, when he is an Army officer, and is granted to the retiring Chief of the Hellenic Army General Staff.

All but one of the other Greek general officer ranks are derivations of this word: antistrátigos and ypostrátigos, for Lieutenant General and Major General, respectively. A Brigadier General however is called taxíarchos, after a táxis (in modern usage taxiarchía), which means brigade. The ranks of antistrátigos and ypostrátigos are also used by the Hellenic Police (and the Greek Gendarmerie before), the Greek Fire Service and the Cypriot National Guard, which lack the grade of full stratigós.

Fictional uses 
The oldest use of the term strategos in fiction may be found in the Callirhoe of Chariton of Aphrodisias which is dated in the first century A.D. There, Hermocrates is the "strategos" of Syracuse and the father of Callirhoe, living in the 5th century B.C. In fact, he was a historical person, the victor over the Athenians in 413 B.C., an event which stopped Athenian expansion to the West. His role as a character in the novel is rather limited. Although his position in Syracuse gives Callirhoe a background, and he gives consent to her marriage and fulfills a few official duties, his legal or constitutional position is not very clear.

This position was featured in Orson Scott Card's novel Ender's Game. In the novel, the position of Strategos was charged with overall command of solar system defense. The Strategos, along with the positions of Polemarch (responsible for the International Fleet of space warships), and the Hegemon (the political leader of Earth, rather like a stronger version of the Secretary-General of the United Nations), was one of the three most powerful people alive. During an earlier war described in the novel, because of a belief in their inherent luck and brilliance—specifically, that no Jewish general had ever lost a war—all three positions were filled with Jewish people: an American Jew as Hegemon, an Israeli Jew as Strategos, and a Russian Jew as Polemarch. The defeat of the Formics by half-Māori Mazer Rackham changed this position. Bean (Julian Delphiki) was given the title of Strategos by Peter Wiggin after he assumed the role of Hegemon. The prequel novel Earth Awakens establishes that the position of Strategos was named after the Strategoi, a group of international military commanders in charge of the Mobile Operations Police, which served as the model for the newly created International Fleet. The first Strategos was Lieutenant Colonel Yulian Robinov of the Russian Ministry of Defense, who served as the chair of the Strategoi during the First Invasion.

The dystopian slave-empire of the Draka, in the series of books by S. M. Stirling, also uses "Strategos" together with many other military ranks and terms drawn from Classical Antiquity, though often with only the loosest resemblance to what they originally meant.

The position of 'Strategos' was also featured in the English version of the Sunrise anime The Vision of Escaflowne; the character Folken occupied the position when he served the Zaibach empire.

It is also used in the webcomic Ava's Demon for Strategos Six.

The term is also used in the 2018 Ubisoft video game Assassin's Creed Odyssey. There is no Athenian variant of them, as they are exclusively Spartan. They are powerful units found in forts and camps, second in power only to that of the Polemarch. They wield heavy blades and shield.

In Xenoblade Chronicles 3, Strategos is the name of an optional character class, given by the character Isurd.

The main protagonist in David Gemmell's Lion of Macedon and Dark Prince, is a half-Spartan, half-Macedonian Strategos, called Parmenion. The real life Parmenion was indeed a Strategos in Ancient Greece.

See also

Footnotes

Citations

General sources 
 Hamel, Debra (1998). Athenian Generals: Military Authority in the Classical Period. Leiden.
 Hansen, M. H. (1987). The Athenian Democracy in the Age of Demosthenes. Oxford.
 
 Oxford Classical Dictionary, 2nd edition. (1996). "strategoi".
 Roberts, John (2005). Dictionary of the Classical World. Oxford.

External links 

 

Ancient Greek military terminology
Ancient Greek titles
Byzantine military offices
Gubernatorial titles
Military ranks of ancient Greece
Military ranks of ancient Macedon
Military ranks of Greece